RC Polytechnic is a Ukrainian rugby club in Odessa. They are one of the four teams comprising the additional group in the Ukraine Rugby Superliga.

History
The club was founded in 1965 by O.H. Burdo who was also the first coach. In 1971 and 1977 they finished third in the Ukrainian Championships.

External links
RC Polytechnic at the Odessa Oblast Rugby Federation

Rugby clubs established in 1965
Ukrainian rugby union teams
Sport in Odesa